Prairie spiderwort is a common name for several plants and may refer to:

Tradescantia bracteata
Tradescantia occidentalis

Tradescantia